Flagg Grove School (or Flaggs' Grove School) was a school south of Nutbush in Haywood County, Tennessee, now part of Brownsville. The school was established in the late 19th century and now operates as the Tina Turner Museum.

History
This was approximately one third the going rate for land at the time in Tennessee.

Singer Tina Turner attended Flagg Grove Elementary School in the 1940s. Turner contributed to the restoration of the school and it was made into the Tina Turner Museum in her honor.

References

Schools in Haywood County, Tennessee
Defunct schools in Tennessee